Anoplognathus porosus is a species  of beetle within the genus Anoplognathus.

Description
Anoplognathus porosus is similar to Anoplognathus olivieri but females lack the lateral elytral expansion and the pygidium is bronze-green, with a border of recumbent white setae

Range
occurs from Victoria to northern Queensland and is a common species around Sydney

References

Insects described in 1817
Scarabaeidae
Insects of Australia